Kaliganj is an upazila (sub-district) of Gazipur District in central Bangladesh, part of the  Dhaka Division.

Geography
It has 32588 households and total area 158.79 km2.

Demographics
As of the 1991 Bangladesh census, Kaliganj has a population of 175915. Males constitute 93.86% of the population, and females 87.14%. This Upazila's eighteen up population is 87404. Kaliganj has an average literacy rate of 90.6% (7+ years), and the national average of 90.4% literate. Main occupations Agriculture 47.35%, dairy and fishery 1.89%, agricultural labourer 11.32%, wage labourer 2.11%, weaving 1.71%, commerce 9.22%, transport 1.79%, service 15.84%, others 8.77%.

Administration
Kaliganj Upazila is divided into Kaliganj Municipality and seven union parishads: Baktarpur, Bhadursadi, Jamalpur, Jangalia, Moktarpur, Nagari, and Tumulia. The union parishads are subdivided into 151 mauzas and 175 villages.

Kaliganj Municipality is subdivided into 9 wards and 23 mahallas.

Education

According to Banglapedia, Saint Nicholas High School is a notable secondary school.

Literacy rate: Average 90.9%; male 91.9%, female 87.8%.

Water Bodies: Shitalkshya River, Balu River, Punshahi Belai Beel, Suti Canal, Stuart-Barnared Canal, Patha Mara Canal.

Archaeological heritage and relics: Tomb of Isa Khan, the ruler of Bhati at Baktarpur, St. Nicholas Church (1695), Mazars and Dighi of Pahlwan Shah Gazi and Karforma Shah at Chaura, Tomb of Shah Bayejid and eight domed Mosque at Vatgati, Kachari Punshahi.

Religious institutions:  Mosque 395, temple 19, church 6.

Important Business places: (Hat/Bazar):
Kaliganj, Jamalpur, Pubail, Ulokhola, Saoraid bazar, Dolan Bazar, Aowrakhali, Punshahi Bazar. Noapara bazar.

Notable residents
 Meher Afroz Chumki, State Minister for Women and Children Affairs, has been Member of Parliament for constituency Gazipur-5 since 2009.
 Humayun Faridi, actor, attended primary school in Kaliganj village.
 Farooque
 Rumana Khan
 Abdullah Al Mamun
 Gazi Golam Mostafa
 Abujafar Shamsuddin
 Nazmul Hoque Khan

See also
 Upazilas of Bangladesh
 Districts of Bangladesh
 Divisions of Bangladesh

References

Upazilas of Gazipur District